Corusca is a genus of Chinese jumping spiders that was first described by Y. Y. Zhou & S. Q. Li in 2013.

Species
 it contains ten species, found only in China:
Corusca acris Zhou & Li, 2013 – China
Corusca bawangensis Zhou & Li, 2013 – China
Corusca falcata Zhou & Li, 2013 – China
Corusca gracilis Zhou & Li, 2013 (type) – China
Corusca jianfengensis Zhou & Li, 2013 – China
Corusca liaoi (Peng & Li, 2006) – China
Corusca sanyaensis Zhou & Li, 2013 – China
Corusca setifera Zhou & Li, 2013 – China
Corusca viriosa Zhou & Li, 2013 – China
Corusca wuzhishanensis Zhou & Li, 2013 – China

References

Salticidae genera
Salticidae
Spiders of China